The Magnificent is a Greatest Hits of the singer–songwriter and producer, Keith Sweat. it was released in June 2009.

Track listing

CD 1

CD 2

2009 greatest hits albums
Keith Sweat compilation albums